Events from the year 1747 in Austria

Incumbents
 Monarch – Maria Theresa

Events

 
 
 May 14 – War of the Austrian Succession – First battle of Cape Finisterre: British victory over the French.

 July 2 – War of the Austrian Succession – Battle of Lauffeld: France defeats the armies of Hanover, Great Britain and the Netherlands.
 October 25 – War of the Austrian Succession – Second battle of Cape Finisterre: The British Navy defeats the French fleet.
 War of the Austrian Succession: Spanish troops invade and occupy the coastal towns of Beaufort and Brunswick in the Royal Colony of North Carolina during what becomes known as the Spanish Alarm. They are later driven out by the local militia.

Births

Deaths

References

 
Years of the 18th century in Austria